Logovardi is a village situated in Pelagonia, east of Bitola, North Macedonia.

Located in the village of Logovardi is the cemetery of the buried French soldiers, who died during World War II. France had deployed many soldiers, to help Yugoslavia during the Nazi invasions of Europe.

History
The village started existing in the 19th century, when it was in the Bitola Kaza in the Ottoman Empire.

Transportation
It is also home of Logovardi Airport, the nearest airport to Bitola.

Demographics
According to the census of 2002, of the 699 inhabitants:
Macedonians - 696
Serbs - 1
Others - 2

References

Villages in Bitola Municipality